The Meeting School (TMS) was a co-ed boarding school for grades 9-12 based on the practices and principles of the Religious Society of Friends (Quakers). It closed in 2011.

The mission of TMS was to prepare students with life skills as well as academic knowledge. In a given year, 30-35 students participated in small classes, community living, growing food, and caring for farm animals. Students were engaged, at a highly empowered level, in community decision making.

Philosophy and purpose 
The Meeting School was a community-based school where students lived together with faculty on a farm. It emphasized the principles and practices of the Religious Society of Friends.
 
The school depended on each individual to accept responsibility for his or her own growth, and to participate fully in the life of the community. The emphasis was to acknowledge and nurture the unique worth and insight of each person in the community and to co-exist with compassion and harmony in daily living, learning and decision making. The underlying philosophy was to undertake joyful living with emotional, intellectual, physical, and spiritual integrity.

Like most Quaker communities, the school and community promoted simplicity, honesty, mutual trust and respect, the dignity of physical labor, care for each other and the earth and the peaceful response to conflict. They believe they are called to seek and to live with divine guidance both individually and collectively.

By providing this kind of nurturing background for secondary students, the hope is that community members will eventually enter into the wider world and contribute profoundly to the lives of others and strive to exemplify a deep sense of compassion and justice.

History of the school 
In 1955 a group of Quaker educators found a shared concern, envisioning a school that would educate the whole person, where Quakerism could be a way of life, and where students could become inner directed rather than outer directed. Consulting with other Quaker groups throughout 1956 and ’57, and traveling through Europe and the United States to become familiar with innovative schools and colleges, three families came together in Rindge, and began their experiment. George Bliss, with his wife Helen, had taught at the Westtown Quaker boarding school, and was then executive secretary of the New England office of the American Friends Service Committee. Joel Hayden, a graduate of Deep Springs College, and his wife Ruth Hayden had been professors at Antioch College in Ohio, and Robert and Thera Hindmarsh were agronomists who advised farmers in Deerfield, Massachusetts. They settled on two converted farmsteads, land that had been farmed since 1771, and opened their doors to students in the fall of 1957.

Academic program 
The Meeting School year ran on the semester system, with the Intersession block falling between the Winter and Spring terms. The school did not use grades, but a pass/fail system of credit with detailed written evaluations.

Classes were organized around the traditional academic subjects of math, writing and literature, social studies and history, sciences, and the arts.  Within these subjects, however, teachers and students worked together to approach learning in ways that were creative, relevant, authentic, and hands-on.

Classes, which met in faculty living rooms, ranged from 5 to 10 students. Class meetings were informal, with opportunities for all voices to be heard.  Projects and choices gave students the chance to take ownership of the subjects they studied.  Teachers were committed to flexibility around different learning styles, paces and goals. Teachers and students valued the chance to make personal connections and relationships a part of learning.

Classes at the school also included electives based heavily around the necessary work of the farm, or around outdoor skills and experiences.  Some students used class blocks for mentorships with faculty who specialized in farm work, cooking, or repair work. The curriculum also emphasized social justice applications, and students were encouraged to think about ways to decrease their ecological footprint.

Self-exploration and healthy life skills were also taught at the school; all students must take Health and Sexuality as well as Peace Studies.

Farm program 
The Meeting School farm was a cornerstone of the experiential learning at the school.  Based on the principles of ecological stewardship and sustainable living, working and living on the farm offered an avenue to educate young people about land care and food production.

Working with animals and the land, and growing and raising much of the actual food that is eaten, is an unrelentingly honest and authentic experience. Students learned very practical skills, work as team members, and enjoy the fruits (and vegetables) of their labor.

Suspension of school program 
Having dwindled to 15 students, in 2011 the school announced that it would take a "sabbatical" for the 2011-2012 school year with the hope of restructuring in a more financially sustainable business model.

TMS made a decision in early 2012 to terminate business for a variety of reasons.

References

External links 
 School blog
 School Myspace site

Quaker schools in New Hampshire
Boarding schools in New Hampshire
Quaker meetings
Schools in Cheshire County, New Hampshire
Private high schools in New Hampshire
Rindge, New Hampshire
1957 establishments in New Hampshire
2012 disestablishments in the United States